Meg Harding (born July 15, 1945) is a former American Democrat politician from Kansas City, Missouri, who served in the Missouri House of Representatives.

Born in Midland, Michigan, she graduated from the University of Michigan. She previously worked as a speech and hearing therapist in public schools of Arlington, Virginia, and in Darmstadt, Germany.

References

1945 births
20th-century American politicians
21st-century American politicians
20th-century American women politicians
21st-century American women politicians
Democratic Party members of the Missouri House of Representatives
Living people
University of Michigan alumni
Women state legislators in Missouri